A medial supraclavicular lymph node is a lymph node located above the collar bone and between the center of the body and a line drawn through the nipple to the shoulder.

External links 
 Medial supraclavicular lymph node entry in the public domain NCI Dictionary of Cancer Terms

Lymphatic organ anatomy